Bosara dilatata is a moth in the family Geometridae. It is found on Borneo, Peninsular Malaysia, Sulawesi and on New Guinea.

Subspecies
Bosara dilatata dilatata (Borneo, Peninsular Malaysia)
Bosara dilatata pelopsaria Walker, 1866 (Sulawesi)
Bosara dilatata hydrographica (Prout, 1958) (New Guinea)

References

Moths described in 1866
Eupitheciini